"That Girl" is the debut solo single from R&B singer Marques Houston and the first taken from his debut album, MH in the U.S. In the UK, however, "Clubbin'" was the first single from the album there.

"That Girl" was originally for Ne-Yo, that co-wrote it, but after Columbia Records dropped him, the song was given to Houston. The song was his first single to chart on the Billboard Hot 100, peaking at number sixty-three in the U.S.

The single was due to be the fourth single from MH in the UK, however, due to the underperformance of the third single there, "Because of You", the single was cancelled, despite the video being serviced to television music channels there. The remix features singer R. Kelly.

Music video
The video was shot in Los Angeles, California in February 2003.  The video starts out with word "That Girl" then "starring Marques Houston". The lead in the music video starring opposite Marques Houston was long time principal dancer for B2K and IMx, Tanee McCall.

References

2002 singles
Marques Houston songs
Songs written by Ne-Yo
Songs written by Patrick "J. Que" Smith
2002 songs
The Ultimate Group singles
Songs written by Marques Houston